Craig Parsons (born 18 June 1965)  is a Paralympic table tennis and wheelchair rugby union player from  Australia. He was born in Subiaco, Western Australia.  He won a silver medal at the 2000 Sydney Games in the mixed wheelchair rugby event. He participated in table tennis at the 1988 Seoul Games.

References

Paralympic wheelchair rugby players of Australia
Wheelchair rugby players at the 2000 Summer Paralympics
Table tennis players at the 1988 Summer Paralympics
Paralympic silver medalists for Australia
Living people
Medalists at the 2000 Summer Paralympics
1965 births
Paralympic medalists in wheelchair rugby